Colobothea erythrophthalma is a species of beetle in the family Cerambycidae. It was described by Voet in 1806.

References

erythrophthalma
Beetles described in 1906